The Shulchan Aruch HaRav (also romanized Shulkhan Arukh HaRav) is especially a record of prevailing halakha by Rabbi Shneur Zalman of Liadi (1745–1812), known during his lifetime as HaRav (Hebrew for "The Rabbi") and as the first Rebbe (Yiddish for "rabbi") of Chabad. Within the Chabad community the work is known as the Alter Rebbe's Shulchan Aruch.

New edition of the Shulchan Aruch
Rabbi Shneur Zalman was asked by his teacher, Rabbi Dov Ber, the Maggid of Mezritch, to write an adjusted version of the Shulchan Aruch (1562 CE) of Rabbi Joseph Karo with reference to later commentaries, as well as subsequent responsa, for nascent Hassidism. The Shulchan Aruch (and its forerunner, the Beit Yosef) was  written from the standpoint of Sephardi Minhag. Rabbi Shneur Zalman composed his updated and adapted Shulchan Aruch (c. 1800), so that Hassidic laymen would be able to study the corresponding Jewish law, and in an attempt to reference halakha (Jewish law) as it stood at his time and place. Aiming to avoid ambiguity or obscurity, the work references the common Hassidic halakha with its underlying reasoning. Chabad-hagiography has it that Shneur Zalman—his works form the very foundation of Chabad philosophy—finished the composition at age of twenty. However, most of the work was lost prior to publication.

Influence
The Shulchan Aruch HaRav is today used by most Hasidim as their basis for daily practice. The work is broadly considered an authoritative halachic text, and is frequently cited by later authorities such as Rabbi Yisrael Meir Kagan in his Mishnah Berurah and the Ben Ish Chai of Rabbi Yosef Chaim of Baghdad, as well as in many contemporary responsa by leading halachic authorities of the nineteenth and twentieth centuries. Shulchan Aruch HaRav is also one of the three works on which Shlomo Ganzfried based his Kitzur Shulchan Aruch, the well-known precis of customary Ashkenazi Halakha.

Although widely accepted, the work was originally limited in printings. Much of the original text was destroyed in a fire in Lubavitch, and only parts of copies of the draft survived. Kehot Publication Society (2002) has recently begun publication of a Bilingual Edition; in this work notations appear whenever Shneur Zalman's rulings are at variance with those in Yosef Karo's Shulchan Aruch.

References

External links
Fulltext (Hebrew), chabadlibrary.org
 Shulchanaruchharav.com

Chabad-Lubavitch texts
Rabbinic legal texts and responsa
Shneur Zalman of Liadi
Hebrew words and phrases in Jewish law
Hebrew-language religious books
Sifrei Kodesh